William Gordon Roe (5 January 193219 July 1999) was a British Anglican bishop who served as Bishop of Huntingdon (the suffragan bishop in the Diocese of Ely) from 1980 until 1997.

Roe was educated at Bournemouth School,  Jesus College, Oxford and St Stephen's House. He was made deacon on Trinity Sunday 1958 (1 June) and ordained priest the Trinity Sunday following (24 May 1959) — both times by Alwyn Williams, Bishop of Winchester, at Winchester Cathedral. After a curacy at Bournemouth he was Priest in charge of St Michael's, Abingdon and then Vice Principal of St Chad's College, Durham. Following this he was Vicar of St Oswald's Durham from 1974–80 and Rural Dean of Durham until his appointment to the episcopate. He was consecrated a bishop on 3 November 1980, by Robert Runcie, Archbishop of Canterbury, at Westminster Abbey.

References

1932 births
1999 deaths
People educated at Bournemouth School
Alumni of Jesus College, Oxford
20th-century Church of England bishops
Bishops of Huntingdon
Academics of Durham University
Alumni of St Stephen's House, Oxford